MEF2C antisense RNA 1 is a protein that in humans is encoded by the MEF2C-AS1 gene.

References